Victory gardens, also called war gardens or food gardens for defense, were vegetable, fruit, and herb gardens planted at private residences and public parks in  the United States, United Kingdom, Canada, Australia and Germany during World War I and World War II. In wartime, governments encouraged people to plant victory gardens not only to supplement their rations but also to boost morale. They were used along with rationing stamps and cards to reduce pressure on the food supply. Besides indirectly aiding the war effort, these gardens were also considered a civil "morale booster" in that gardeners could feel empowered by their contribution of labor and rewarded by the produce grown. This made victory gardens a part of daily life on the home front.

World War I

Canada 

Victory Gardens became popular in Canada in 1917. Under the Ministry of Agriculture's campaign, "A Vegetable Garden for Every Home", residents of cities, towns and villages utilized backyard spaces to plant vegetables for personal use and war effort. In the city of Toronto, women's organizations brought expert gardeners into the schools to get school children and their families interested in gardening. In addition to gardening, homeowners were encouraged to keep hens in their yards for the purpose of collecting eggs. The result was a large production of potatoes, beets, cabbage, and other useful vegetables.

United States

In March 1917, Charles Lathrop Pack organized the US National War Garden Commission and launched the war garden campaign. Food production had fallen dramatically during World War I, especially in Europe, where agricultural labor had been recruited into military service and remaining farms devastated by the conflict.  Pack and others conceived the idea that the supply of food could be greatly increased without the use of land and manpower already engaged in agriculture, and without the significant use of transportation facilities needed for the war effort.  The campaign promoted the cultivation of available private and public lands, resulting in over five million gardens in the US  and foodstuff production exceeding $1.2 billion by the end of the war.

President Woodrow Wilson said that "Food will win the war." To support the home garden effort, a United States School Garden Army was launched through the Bureau of Education, and funded by the War Department at Wilson's direction.

World War II

Australia
Australia launched a Dig for Victory campaign in 1942 as rationing and a shortage of agricultural workers began to affect food supplies. The situation began to ease in 1943; however, home gardens continued throughout the war.

Britain
In Britain, "digging for victory" used much land such as waste ground, railway edges, ornamental gardens and lawns, while sports fields and golf courses were requisitioned for farming or vegetable growing. Sometimes a sports field was left as it was but used for sheep-grazing instead of being mown (for example see ). Other schools, like Winchester College, ploughed their fields to grow vegetables for school consumption, supplementing the meagre soil fertility by raising pigs for their manure. By 1943, the number of allotments had roughly doubled to 1,400,000, including rural, urban and suburban plots. C. H. Middleton's radio programme In Your Garden reached millions of listeners keen for advice on growing potatoes, leeks and the like, and helped ensure a communal sense of contributing to the war effort (as well as a practical response to food rationing). County Herb Committees were established to collect medicinal herbs when German blockades created shortages, for instance in Digitalis purpurea (Foxglove) which was used to regulate heartbeat. Victory gardens were planted in backyards and on apartment-building rooftops, with the occasional vacant lot "commandeered for the war effort!" and put to use as a cornfield or a squash patch. During World War II, sections of lawn were publicly plowed for plots in Hyde Park, London to promote the movement, while allotments growing onions in the shadow of the Albert Memorial also pointed to everybody, high and low, chipping in to the national struggle.  Both Buckingham Palace and Windsor Castle had vegetable gardens planted at the instigation of King George VI to assist with food production.

United States
Amid regular rationing of food in Britain, the United States Department of Agriculture  encouraged the planting of victory gardens during the course of World War II. Around one third of the vegetables produced by the United States came from victory gardens. It was emphasized to American homefront urbanites and suburbanites that the produce from their gardens would help to lower the price of vegetables needed by the US War Department to feed the troops, thus saving money that could be spent elsewhere on the military: "Our food is fighting", one US poster read. By May 1943, there were 18 million victory gardens in the United States – 12 million in cities and 6 million on farms.

Eleanor Roosevelt planted a Victory Garden on the White House lawn in 1943. The Roosevelts were not the first presidency to institute a garden in the White House. Woodrow Wilson grazed sheep on the south lawn during World War I to avoid mowing the lawn. Eleanor Roosevelt's garden instead served as a political message of the patriotic duty to garden, even though Eleanor did not tend to her own garden. While Victory Gardens were portrayed as a patriotic duty, 54% of Americans polled said they grew gardens for economic reasons while only 20% mentioned patriotism.

Although at first the Department of Agriculture objected to Eleanor Roosevelt's institution of a victory garden on the White House grounds, fearing that such a movement would hurt the food industry, basic information about gardening appeared in public services booklets distributed by the Department of Agriculture, as well as by agribusiness corporations such as International Harvester and Beech-Nut. Fruit and vegetables harvested in these home and community plots was estimated to be  in 1944, an amount equal to all commercial production of fresh vegetables.

The Victory Garden movement also attempted to unite the Home-front. Local communities would have festivals and competitions to showcase the produce each person grew in their own gardens. While the garden movement united some local communities, the garden movement separated minorities like African Americans. At harvest shows, separate prizes were awarded to "colored people", in similar categories, a long-held tradition in Delaware and the deeper South, as well as in Baltimore.

In New York City, the lawns around vacant "Riverside" were devoted to victory gardens, as were portions of San Francisco's Golden Gate Park. The slogan "grow your own, can your own", was a slogan that started at the time of the war and referred to families growing and canning their own food in victory gardens.

Postwar
In 1946, with the war over, many British residents did not plant victory gardens, in expectation of greater availability of food. However, shortages remained in the United Kingdom, and rationing remained in place for at least some food items until 1954.

Land at the centre of the Sutton Garden Suburb in Sutton, London was first put to use as a victory garden during World War II; before then it had been used as a recreation ground with tennis courts. The land continued to be used as allotments by local residents for more than 50 years until they were evicted by the then landowner in 1997. The land has since fallen into disuse.

The Fenway Victory Gardens in the Back Bay Fens of Boston, Massachusetts, and the Dowling Community Garden in Minneapolis, Minnesota remain active as the last surviving public examples from World War II. Most plots in the Fenway Victory Gardens now feature flowers instead of vegetables while the Dowling Community Garden retains its focus on vegetables.

Since the turn of the 21st century, interest in victory gardens has grown. A campaign promoting such gardens has  sprung up in the form of new victory gardens in public spaces, victory garden websites and blogs, as well as petitions to renew a national campaign for the victory garden and to encourage the re-establishment of a victory garden on the White House lawn. In March 2009, First Lady Michelle Obama planted an  "Kitchen Garden" on the White House lawn, the first since Eleanor Roosevelt's, to raise awareness about healthy food.

Films 
Several countries produced numerous information films about growing victory gardens.

Canada
 World War II
 He Plants for Victory (1943)

United Kingdom
 World War I
 Grow Vegetables For War Effort
 War Garden Parade
 World War II
 Dig For Victory! (1940, 1941, 1942)
 Children's Allotment Gardens (1942)
 Compost Heaps for Feeding (1942)
 Digging For Victory (1943)
 Winter Greens (1943)
 Blitz on Bugs (1944)
 Dig for Victory - Proceed According To Plan (1944)

United States
 World War II
 Victory Gardens (1941, 1942, 1943)
 Barney Bear's Victory Garden (1942)
 As Ye Sow (1945)

Television
Historical documentary and reality television series such as The 1940s House, Wartime Farm and the second season of Coal House place modern families in a recreated wartime settings, including digging victory gardens.

The WGBH public-television series The Victory Garden took the familiar expression to promote composting and intensive cropping for homeowners who wanted to raise some vegetables (and some flowers).

The 1975 sitcom The Good Life portrays the efforts of Tom and Barbara Good to become self-sufficient in their suburban home, including turning over most of their garden to vegetable production and a chicken coop. Tom explains to his baffled neighbours that "We're digging for victory!" despite their protests that "That was during the War..." Much of the early episodes follow the Goods' struggle to adapt to living from their victory garden.

See also
 Australian Women's Land Army
 Community garden
 Home front during World War II
 List of garden types
 List of renewable resources produced and traded by the United Kingdom
 Rationing in the United Kingdom
 United States home front during World War II
 Women's Land Army
 Woman's Land Army of America
 Food Sovereignty

References

Further reading
  Cecilia Gowdy-Wygant. Cultivating Victory: The Women's Land Army and the Victory Garden Movement (2013) in Britain and U.S. in both world wars;  excerpt
  Ginn, Franklin. "Dig for victory! New histories of wartime gardening in Britain." Journal of Historical Geography 38#3 (2012): 294-305.
 
 Kuhn, Clifford M., "‘It Was a Long Way from Perfect, but It Was Working’: The Canning and Home Production Initiatives in Green County, Georgia, 1940–1942," Agricultural History (2012) 86#1 pp 68–90.
 
 C. H. Middleton, Digging for Victory ([1942] London 2008)

External links

 Recipe for Victory: Food and Cooking in Wartime
 PBS: The Victory Garden
 A Visual History of Victory Gardens curated by Michigan State University
  Victory Garden complete film at archive.org
 History of Urban Gardening in the United States
 GARDENS FOR VICTORY reference pubbed Mar. 1942, intro/first chapter
 Victory Garden Initiative - a grassroots organization in Milwaukee, Wisconsin promoting revival of the victory garden movement as a means to address food system and environmental issues.
 Oldest Remaining Victory Gardens in Boston
 1943 propaganda film He Plants for Victory (National Film Board of Canada)
 1941 propaganda film Victory Gardens (United States Department of Agriculture)

Civilians in war
Types of garden
Landscape history
Garden design history
Urban agriculture
Home front during World War II
United States home front during World War II
Home front during World War I